Lucky Thompson Plays Jerome Kern and No More is an album led by saxophonist Lucky Thompson recorded in 1963 and released on the Moodsville label.

Reception

AllMusic awarded the album 3 stars.

Track listing 
All compositions by Lucky Thompson except where noted
 "They Didn't Believe Me" (Jerome Kern, Herbert Reynolds) – 5:03 
 "Long Ago (And Far Away)" (Kern, Ira Gershwin) – 4:01  
 "Who?" (Kern, Otto Harbach, Oscar Hammerstein II) – 2:44 
 "Why Do I Love You?" (Kern, Hammerstein) – 3:09  
 "Lovely to Look At" (Kern, Dorothy Fields, Jimmy McHugh) – 2:59
 "Dearly Beloved" (Kern, Johnny Mercer) – 3:32 
 "Look for the Silver Lining" (Kern, Buddy DeSylva) – 2:56 
 "Why Was I Born?" (Kern, Hammerstein) – 3:50     
 "No More" – 5:29

Personnel 
Lucky Thompson – tenor saxophone, soprano saxophone  
Hank Jones – piano
Wendell Marshall – bass
Dave Bailey – drums

References 

Lucky Thompson albums
1963 albums
Moodsville Records albums
Albums produced by Don Schlitten
Albums recorded at Van Gelder Studio